Urs-Ulrich Bucher (6 September 1926 – 17 April 2002) was a Swiss sailor who competed in the 1960 Summer Olympics and in the 1964 Summer Olympics.

References

1926 births
2002 deaths
Swiss male sailors (sport)
Olympic sailors of Switzerland
Sailors at the 1960 Summer Olympics – Star
Sailors at the 1964 Summer Olympics – Star